Raising the Bar is an American legal drama created by Steven Bochco and David Feige, which ran on TNT network from September 1, 2008 to December 24, 2009.

Plot
Idealistic public defender Jerry Kellerman does whatever it takes to assist the helpless and disenfranchised, which often leads to clashes in the courtroom presided over by Judge Trudy Kessler, a hard-liner hoping to become the city's next district attorney. Jerry has many clashes with both law enforcement and the assistant district attorneys (ADAs) such as Michelle Ernhardt, the beautiful and occasionally devious attorney with whom he has had a turbulent secret fling.

Cast and characters
Mark-Paul Gosselaar as Jerry Kellerman
Gloria Reuben as Rosalind Whitman
Jane Kaczmarek as Trudy Kessler
Melissa Sagemiller as Michelle Earnhardt
Jonathan Scarfe as Charlie Sagansky
J. August Richards as Marcus McGrath
Currie Graham as Nick Balco
Teddy Sears as Richard Patrick Woolsley
Natalia Cigliuti as Roberta "Bobbi" Gilardi

Recurring
Stacy Hall as Vince Culp
Jon Polito as Judge Dominick Ventimigla
Paul Joyner as Assistant District Attorney
John Michael Higgins as Judge Albert Farnsworth
Heath Freeman as Gavin Dillon
Angel Oquendo as Carlos
Octavia Spencer as Arvina Watkins
Max Greenfield as David Steinberg
Josh Randall as Tim Porter
Wilson Cruz as Rafael de la Cruz

Production
Raising the Bar was originally announced to be joining TNT as a new series in January 2008. It came to TNT through ABC Studios and Steven Bochco served as executive producer, with Jesse Bochco as co-executive producer and David Feige as supervising producer. After completing its first season of 10 hour-long episodes in November 2008, the series was renewed for a 15-episode second season, which premiered on Monday June 8, 2009 at 10p.m ET/ 9 p.m. CT. The show was canceled after season 2.

Episodes

Season 1 (2008)

Season 2 (2009)

Cancellation
TNT confirmed to E! Online on November 30, 2009 that the series would not be renewed for a third season. The final three episodes were burned off in a marathon December 24, 2009.

Reception
The series debut garnered 7.7 million viewers. It was the biggest audience ever for a new-series launch on basic cable. It beat the record set in 2004 by USA Network's launch of The 4400 which opened with an average of 7.4 million viewers; runner-up was TNT's The Closer, which recorded 7 million viewers when it was unveiled in 2005.
Following the premiere, ratings evened out to around 5.5 million viewers per episode. For calendar-year 2008 on a first-run basis, the series delivered 1.37 million viewers in the 18–49 demographic, garnering mixed reviews.

Home media

References

External links

2008 American television series debuts
2009 American television series endings
2000s American workplace drama television series
2000s American legal television series
American legal drama television series
English-language television shows
Television series by ABC Studios
TNT (American TV network) original programming
Television series created by Steven Bochco
Television series about prosecutors